Aulopoma helicinum is a species of small land snail with an operculum, terrestrial pulmonate gastropod mollusc in the family Cyclophoridae. It is endemic to Sri Lanka.

It is about 14mm in length.

References

Cyclophoridae
Gastropods described in 1786